At least two ships of the Argentine Navy have been named ARA Tucumán:

 , a  originally ordered by Argentina that was purchased by Greece (as Leon) in 1912 before delivery
 , a  launched in 1928 and decommissioned in 1962.

Argentine Navy ship names